The Protestant church of Drogeham or Saint Nicholas church is a church in Drogeham, Netherlands. The current church was built in 1876 on the site of an older church built in the 13th century. The church is built against the 13th century tower of the old church and on top of the tower it is a gable roof. The old church was a Roman Catholic church dedicated to Saint Nicholas but became a Protestant church after the Protestant Reformation.

The church located on Tsjerkebuorren 4. and is listed as a Rijksmonument, number 7042 and is rated with a very high historical value.

References

Achtkarspelen
Drogeham
Rijksmonuments in Friesland
Protestant churches in the Netherlands